Heliocosma argyroleuca is a species of moth of the Tortricoidea superfamily. It is found in Australia, including Tasmania.

References

Tortricoidea
Moths of Australia
Moths described in 1916